Robert Zorba Paster is a physician and radio show host.

Paster was born on August 19, 1947, and raised in Chicago. He hosts a weekly radio call-in show on personal health issues called Zorba Paster on Your Health.  The show is produced by Wisconsin Public Radio, syndicated by the Public Radio Exchange, and is broadcast on public radio stations around the United States.  The show's trademark is a lighthearted, humorous approach, made possible by Zorba's banter with his co-host, Tom Clark.  The show's style is somewhat similar to National Public Radio's program, Car Talk, providing callers both with good advice and kind-hearted ribbing.

In addition to his weekly show for Wisconsin Public Radio, Paster provides weekly medical commentaries on WISC-TV in Madison and writes a column for the Wisconsin State Journal and other newspapers across the country. He is also the  editor of TopHealth,  a monthly wellness letter with more than 1 million readers. Paster has written The Longevity Code: Your Prescription for a Longer, Sweeter Life with Susan Meltsner, published by Random House.  He writes of "the Long Sweet Life", and states that achieving longevity is much more complex than merely maintaining healthy diet and exercise.

Paster and his wife have been involved in Tibetan causes since 1968, having studied under Geshe Sopa, one of America's premier teachers of Tibetan Buddhism In June 2008, together with Dr. Richard Chaisson and Kunchok Dorjee, he participated to help improving a program of the Tibetan Delek Hospital supported by Johns Hopkins University and aiming to control tuberculosis within the Tibetan diaspora. Paster is the Chairman of Friends of Tibetan Delek Hospital an organization aiming to help Delek Hospital. Dr. Paster is also actively involved in providing medical care for His Holiness the Dali Lama along with Dr. Tsetan Sandutshang, His Holiness’s primary physician.

Paster received his pre-med degree from the University of Wisconsin - Madison and his MD from the University of Illinois, Chicago. He did his internship and residency at Dalhousie University School of Medicine, Halifax, Nova Scotia.

He is a practicing family physician at the Dean Medical Center near Madison, Wisconsin.  Additionally, he is a professor of Family Medicine at the University of Wisconsin School of Medicine and Public Health where he teaches medical residents and medical students.  He and his family live in Oregon, Wisconsin.

Publications
Heart-Healthy, Low-Fat, Guilt-Free and Tasty Recipes from the Kitchen of Zorba Paster.
Wisconsin Public Radio Association, 2000.
The Longevity Code: Your Prescription for a Longer, Sweeter Life written with Susan Melstner. New York: Random House, 2001.
Zorba Paster, "My Trip to See His Holiness, the Dalai Lama," Wisconsin Public Radio, https://web.archive.org/web/20090722100619/http://www.wpr.org:80/zorba/article_dalailama.htm (accessed 16 December 2009).

References

External links

"Zorba Paster on Your Health" WPR Wisconsin Public Radio
To The Best Of Our Knowledge, "Medicine and Compassion," Wisconsin Public Radio. https://web.archive.org/web/20120125085144/http://ttbook.org:80/book/compassion-and-medicine (accessed 22 January 2012)

Radio personalities from Chicago
Radio personalities from Milwaukee
American talk radio hosts
Living people
University of Illinois Chicago alumni
University of Wisconsin–Madison alumni
Year of birth missing (living people)
University of Wisconsin–Madison faculty
Physicians from Wisconsin
Radio personalities from Wisconsin
Writers from Chicago
Writers from Milwaukee
People from Oregon, Wisconsin